The Intergenerational Foundation (IF) is a charitable UK-based thinktank established to promote fairness between generations. IF believe that each generation should pay its own way, which - they claim - is not happening at present. They postulate that British policy-makers have given undue advantages to the older generation at the expense of younger and future generations.

Its publications  include "Hoarding of Housing", and "How the Localism Act Hands Power to Older Generations".

In November 2012 it launched a film competition with The Guardian.

Its co-founders Ashley Seager, Ed Howker, Shiv Malik and Angus Hanton, are regularly cited in the British media.

Co-founders Shiv Malik and Ed Howker are also co-authors of Jilted Generation. and its advisory board includes Professor Jörg Tremmel (director of Foundation for the Rights of Future Generations from 2001-2008), Danny Dorling, Professor of Geography at Oxford University and James Sloam, Reader in Politics and International Relations at Royal Holloway.

References

Think tanks based in the United Kingdom